Nathan William Jeremy Hughes (born 10 June 1991) is a professional rugby union player who is currently unattached.  He most recently played for Bristol Bears.  Born in Fiji he qualified to play for England on residency and won 22 caps between 2016 and 2019. He plays as a flanker, a number 8 or at lock.

Career
In 2009, Hughes was scouted by Athens Henare, the head of the PE department at New Zealand's Kelston Boys' High School, during Kelston's tour of Fiji and went to the school on a partial scholarship. In his first year, Hughes scooped the Team Player of the Year Award. He also made the Auckland rugby union team Under-18s team and followed this up by making the Auckland Under-20s team while still playing for Kelston Boys' High School 1st XV.  This resulted in him joining the Auckland High Performance Academy.

In January 2012, he returned to Fiji to take part in the invitational Uprising 7s, missing the New Zealand 7s team trials for the chance to represent Fiji. He played for the Auckland Invitational side coached by former Fiji 15s coach, Wayne Pivac. He also helped his Auckland side win the NZ 7s Championships in 2012.

Nathan made his debut off the bench for Auckland against Otago in the 2011 ITM Cup.

In February 2013, he was selected by the then Fiji 15s coach, Inoke Male to join the Fiji Warriors team for the 2013 Pacific Rugby Cup. He was named the Vice-captain of the Warriors' team which was skippered by winger Nemani Nadolo who went on to sign for Leicester Tigers.

In March 2013, Hughes signed for English Premiership side, Wasps.

Hughes had strong performances in the 2013–14 Premiership season and considered his international allegiance as he was eligible for Fiji, Samoa and also England in 2016.

In March 2015, during the 2014–15 season, he was red carded (a career first) in the game against Northampton Saints after his shin collided with George North's head after he had scored a try, knocking him unconscious. He was handed a 3-week suspension but an appeal was lodged and he was cleared. His red card and three-week ban were judged to have been predicated more on the injury to North than the intent of the challenge.

In January 2019, it was announced that Hughes had signed a three-year contract with Bristol Bears beginning from the start of the 2019–20 season.

In January 2022, having played some games for Hartpury University R.F.C., he joined Bath on a short-term loan, winning the Player of the Match award in his first game in which Bath defeated Premiership champions Harlequins.

International career
In August 2016, Hughes was named in the provisional 45-man elite player squad (EPS) England squad for their pre-season training camp. On 30 September 2016 he was named in the training squad for the Autumn Internationals.

In November 2016, he made his debut for England, coming off the bench against South Africa to replace Tom Wood in the 53rd minute.  He won twenty-two caps between 2016 and 2019 with his last coming against Scotland at Twickenham on 16 March 2019.

International tries

Personal life
Hughes was born and raised in Lautoka, Fiji.  He attended St Thomas High School in Lautoka and represented the school in hockey, which he played throughout most of his childhood. Hughes' father William Hughes represented Fiji at hockey.  His uncle, Asaeli Hughes, is a dual international having represented Fiji at both 15s rugby and basketball.

External links 
 
 Auckland Rugby
 Wasps profile
 NZ Yahoo profile

References 

1991 births
Wasps RFC players
Bristol Bears players
Hartpury University R.F.C. players
Bath Rugby players
Fijian rugby union players
Living people
Sportspeople from Lautoka
Auckland rugby union players
Fijian people of British descent
Fijian people of I-Taukei Fijian descent
England international rugby union players
Rugby union flankers
Rugby union number eights
Rugby union locks
Black Rams Tokyo players